Philippe Macquer (15 February 1720, Paris – 27 January 1770) was a French historian and lawyer. His brother was the chemist Pierre Joseph Macquer.

Life
He came from a family of Scottish origins. His health did not allow him to devoted himself to being a lawyer to the Parlement of Paris and so he dedicated himself to literature. He is notable for his summaries of history, known for their clarity and precision in a similar vein to président Hénault. He contributed to the Dictionnaire portatif des arts et métiers (1766, 2 vol. in-8°, republished and expanded by abbé Pierre Jaubert as Dictionnaire raisonné universel des arts et métiers, 1773, 4 vol.). This work was strongly critiqued by Melchior Grimm, spokesman for the Encyclopédistes - he accused Macquer of plagiarism. The controversy is analysed by Jacques Proust.

Works 
 Abrégé chronologique de l'histoire ecclésiastique, de 33 à 1700, 1751, 2 volumes ; 1757 ; expanded by abbé Joseph Antoine Toussaint Dinouart, 1768, 3 volumes ; published in Italian, 1757 ; published in German by abbé Rauscher, Vienna, 1788, 4 volumes in octavo
 Annales romaines ou abrégé chronologique de l'histoire romaine depuis la fondation de Rome jusqu'aux empereurs, 1756 ; La Haye, 1757; translated into English by Thomas Nugent
 Abrégé chronologique de l'histoire d'Espagne et de Portugal, collaboration with Jacques Lacombe and Charles-Jean-François Hénault, 1759, 2 volumes
 Dictionnaire portatif des Arts et Métiers, contenant en abrégé l’histoire, la description & la police des arts & métiers, des fabriques & manufactures de France & des pays étrangers, Paris : chez Jacques Lacombe, 1766, 2 volumes in octavo ; Yverdon, 1766-1767, in octavo ; Amsterdam : Arkstée et Merkus, 1767, 2 volumes in octavo
 with  l'abbé Jaubert, Dictionnaire raisonné universel des Arts et Métiers, contenant leur description, et la police des manufactures de France et des pays étrangers, Paris : chez Pierre-François Didot jeune (1731-1795), 1773, 4 volumes in octavo ; Lyon : A. Leroy, 1793-1801, 5 volumes in octavo ; frequently republished (the first edition was produced by Macquer in 1766, but Jaubert's several additions meant that the work no longer appeared under Macquer's name)

References

Sources 
  Cardinal Georges Grente (ed.), Dictionnaire des lettres françaises. Le siecle XVIII, new edition edited and published under François Moureau, Paris, Fayard, 1995.

French people of Scottish descent
18th-century French historians
Writers from Paris
1720 births
1770 deaths